is a Japanese footballer currently playing as a left-back for Boso Rovers Kisarazu.

Personal life
Ishido's brother, Kazuto Ishido, is a retired footballer.

Career statistics

Club
.

Notes

References

External links

1992 births
Living people
Association football people from Saitama Prefecture
Toin University of Yokohama alumni
Japanese footballers
Association football defenders
Japan Football League players
J3 League players
FC Kariya players
Tochigi City FC players
Fukushima United FC players